The Megas is a Los Angeles based independent video game cover band based on the Capcom franchise, Mega Man. They differentiate themselves from artists who have played Mega Man music in the past by adding original lyrics and composing new sections which blend seamlessly with the original compositions. Their lyrics expand on the simple story laid out in the games, giving each of the 8 Robot Masters a unique personality. Their debut album, Get Equipped, based on Mega Man 2, was released in January 2008.

The band has gained notoriety in the video game music scene due to their popularity on sites like Newgrounds and MySpace, as well as numerous live performances all over the United States, primarily at video game conventions and festivals such as MAGfest, Nerdapalooza, and various dates of the Video Games Live tour.  Their song "The Annihilation of Monsteropolis/Airman" was featured on the front page of the popular video game music remixing site OverClocked ReMix, and the band itself has been mentioned on Wired magazine's blog, the official Capcom blog and an article on Gibson Guitars' website. The Megas were mentioned again on the official Capcom blog after the release of their acoustic album, Get Acoustic.

On May 15, 2014, The Megas released their third album, History Repeating: Red, the second half of their take on Mega Man 3. This follows their release of History Repeating: Blue on June 18, 2012.

History

Formation and Get Equipped (2008) 
Josh Breeding arranged and performed a version of the song "I Want to be The One" (based on the Dr. Wily 1-2 theme) for a school talent show. Later, he played the song for Eric von Doymi, a friend that he met at Cal State Long Beach. The two of them re-recorded the track and the band formed shortly after, picking up bassist Greg Schneider (previously of the band Agent 51) and drummer Dave Jensen. The first songs were laid out and performed live at video game themed shows and local venues, but the band continued as a side project for a couple of years up until the recording of their first official album, Get Equipped. Drummer Mike Levinson, who previously played in Agent 51 with Schneider, joined the band, taking the place of second drummer Brent Firestone.

The band constructed a studio, dubbed "Dr. Light Studios," and then focused on recording and releasing their first album, Get Equipped, which was released in January 2008. Get Equipped features a complete collection of arrangements for each main theme from Mega Man 2, including an arrangement with original elements that turns the character select theme—originally only a few seconds long—into a full-length song titled "The Message From Dr. Light." Ironically, this song was later turned back into an NES chiptune by Inverse Phase and titled "The NESsage from Dr. Light." The track was quickly endorsed by The Megas and used as bonus material with online orders.

Megatainment, Get Acoustic, and work with brentalfloss (2009–2010) 
In 2009 on the band's official Facebook page, it was stated that there is a "Mega Man 3 album coming soon." In June of the same year, Breeding announced via Facebook that the band is now recording. In July, the band announced via their official MySpace that they would be handing out free download cards at Comic-Con for two songs off Get Equipped and two songs from the upcoming Get Acoustic acoustic remix of Get Equipped. August 24, 2009, The Megas released the Megatainment EP, a Mega Man 1 based collaborative EP with the band Entertainment System. In an interview in October 2009, the band said their next projects include Mega Man 3, Mega Man X, and Mega Man 9 albums. The band was originally set to be a part of the Mega Man 9 soundtrack, but the project never got past the concept stage. February 4, 2010, The Megas released Get Acoustic digitally and stated they will head back to the studio to work on their Mega Man 3 follow-up to Get Equipped.

In April 2010, The Megas were featured on brentalfloss's album What If This CD...Had Lyrics?. brentalfloss added his lyrics to the instrumental breaks of The Megas' song "I Want To Be The One/Dr. Wily," as well as harmonizing with their original vocals at a few key points to create a new track entitled "Gotta Run/Be the One."

History Repeating (2010–2016) 
While the band was hard at work on their Mega Man 3 album, they released a single as a preview for the album, titled Sparked A War, at Nerdapalooza and released it online soon after. The CD features the band's first single from their Mega Man 3 album (their rendition of Sparkman, "You've Sparked A War"), as well as a few b-sides. In October, the band released their music video for "You've Sparked a War."

In September 2010, two gameplay trailers of the now-cancelled game Mega Man Universe were released featuring The Megas music in the background. The first of which has "The Message from Dr. Light/Level Select" and the second has "Lights Out." A third, longer version of the same trailer was shown in the 2010 Tokyo Game Show featuring "You've Sparked a War."

The band announced they would be playing Video Games Live on June 8, 2011 and the 2011 Penny Arcade Expo. Drummer Mike Levinson announced in January 2012 that he would be making a solo album and funding it through Kickstarter where he also mentioned that the Mega Man 3 album would be named History Repeating. The band announced on June 8, 2012, that they would be releasing a double album for History Repeating, with the first album History Repeating: Blue to be released on June 18, 2012.

On June 28, Mike Levinson announced he would be leaving the band in order to go back to college. The band have confirmed they would not do full music albums from Mega Man 4 or Mega Man 5.

The second History Repeating album, History Repeating: Red was released on May 13, 2014.  Like Blue, it was preceded by a preview album, Fly On A Dog, released in December 2012, featuring the band's first single from Red (based on the Mega Man 3 stage select music), as well as a few B-sides.  When placed in a pyramid, the album artwork from History Repeating: Blue, History Repeating: Red, and Fly On A Dog combined to form an image of Gamma, the final boss of Mega Man 3.

An EP entitled The Quick and the Blue was released in 2016, which featured two songs from Get Equipped, which were re-recorded and featured additional synthesizers in the style of the History Repeating albums.

The Belmonts (2016- present) 

In September 2016, the band released a three-song EP under the name The Belmonts, featuring covers of Bloody Tears, Heart Of Fire, and Out Of Time from the Castlevania series.

On October 31, 2018, the band debuted a surprise Halloween-themed EP as a collaboration between The Megas and The Belmonts titled Skulls, featuring covers of "Skull Man Stage" from Mega Man 4, "Burn" by The Cure, and "Wicked Child" and "Vampire Killer" from Castlevania, the latter of which features guest vocals by Amanda Lepre of Andrew W.K.

On December 17, 2018, the band released a surprise Christmas-themed single titled "Chill Xmas," a cover of "Chill Penguin Stage" from Mega Man X and their first foray into the Mega Man X series, with a parody cover of "Blue Christmas" by Elvis Presley as a B-side.

On March 2, 2020, the band released a second Megas/Belmonts collaboration EP, titled Snakes, featuring a cover of "Stalker" from Castlevania, a new recording of "Evolution of Circuitry," "Rogumer Storm," a cover of "Storm Eagle Stage" from Mega Man X, and a cover of "Yours Truly, 2095" by Electric Light Orchestra.

Musical style 
The original music from Mega Man 2 is an 8-bit format from the NES.  The Megas use guitar, bass guitar, keyboard piano, and drums to create songs inspired by the original themes of each boss stage, as well as other soundtrack selections such as the enemy selected music and the ending song music. Original lyrics are created for the songs, typically centered around each of the Robot Masters' personalities, made up based on their level design and their appearance.

Band members

Current members
 Josh "Rev. Breeding" Breeding — vocals, guitar (2008–present)
 Eric "E" von Doymi — vocals, guitar (2008–present)
 Greg "Gregatron" Schneider — bass, backing vocals (2008–present)
 Brian "Double D" DiDomenico - keyboards (2011–present)
 Greg "Church" Herschleb - drums (2012–present)

Former members
 Mike "Mikey Hell" Levinson — drums (2008–2012)

Timeline

Discography

Studio albums
 Get Equipped (2008)
 History Repeating: Blue (2012)
 History Repeating: Red (2014)

EPs
 Megatainment (2009) with Entertainment System
 Sparked a War (2010)
 Fly on a Dog (2012)
 The Belmonts (2016)
 Skulls (2018)
 Snakes (2020)

Remix albums
 Get Acoustic (2010)

Demos
 Demo Get (2008)

Singles
 "Scent Blasters" (2013)
 "The Quick and the Blue (enhanced edition)" (2016) from MM25: Mega Man Rocks
 "Man on Fire (enhanced edition)" (2016) from MM25: Mega Man Rocks
 "I'm Not The Breakman (Street Cleaner Remix)" (2018) with Street Cleaner
 "Chill Xmas" (2018)

Music videos
 "You've Sparked a War" (2010)
 "Gotta Run/Be the One" (2011)

Other appearances

See also
Video game music culture

References

External links 
 Official website
 The Megas at MySpace
 An Interview with The Megas
 The Megas announce Megatainment, a Mega Man 1 tribute
 Capcom-Unity
 Feature: Video Armageddon
 VG Frequency » Blog Archive » The Megas release debut arrangement album, “Get Equipped”

2008 establishments in California
American experimental rock groups
Indie rock musical groups from California
Musical groups established in 2008
Musical groups from Los Angeles
Musical quintets
Nintendocore musical groups
Video game music cover bands